The ACB Most Spectacular Player, also known as the KIA ACB Most Spectacular Player for sponsorship reasons, is the annual award that is given to the "most spectacular player" of each regular season phase of the Liga ACB, which is the top-tier level professional club basketball league in the country of Spain. The award began with the Liga ACB 2008–09 season.  

The award is given to the player with the most total points gathered throughout the season in each week's KIA Top 7 Plays of the Week. The #1 play of the week earns a player 7 points, the #2 play of the week earns a player 6 points, and so on.

Most Spectacular Players
Player nationality by national team:

References

External links 
 Spanish ACB League official website 
 Spanish ACB League at eurobasket.com

 
European basketball awards
Spanish sports trophies and awards
Awards established in 2009
2009 establishments in Spain